Pierre Xavier Fonkeu (born 10 July 1997) is a Cameroonian footballer who plays as a forward for Dartford.

Early life
Fonkeu was born in Belgium.

Club career
Having come through the youth ranks at Club Brugge, Fonkeu joined Norwich City on a two-year contract on 31 August 2017 following a trial period with the club. He was released by the club in summer 2019 following the expiry of his contract.

On 27 June 2019, it was announced that Fonkeu had signed for RC Lens, initially joining their reserve team in the Championnat National 2. However, he played just once for their reserve side and joined Bulgarian First League club Beroe in February 2020. He played 3 times for Beroe but was released at the end of the season.

Following a trial spell at Grimsby Town, Fonkeu was offered a short-term deal with the Mariners, however this was held up due to delays in obtaining international clearance, and fell through after the departure of manager Ian Holloway. Fonkeu signed for National League club Weymouth on a permanent deal on 30 January 2021. He made his debut for Weymouth as a substitute in a 1–0 home defeat to Notts County later that day. He made 15 appearances for Weymouth during the 2020–21 season. He was released by the club at the end of the season following the expiry of his contract.

On 25 February 2022, Fonkeu joined National League South side Hemel Hempstead Town. He made 11 appearances and scored twice during the 2021–22 season.

On 1 August 2022, Fonkeu joined Dartford ahead of the 2022–23 season.

International career
He has represented Cameroon at under-23 level and was part of their squad for the 2019 Africa U-23 Cup of Nations, where he was an unused substitute in all three matches.

Career statistics

References

1997 births
Living people
Belgian footballers
Cameroonian footballers
Cameroon youth international footballers
Association football forwards
Club Brugge KV players
Norwich City F.C. players
RC Lens players
PFC Beroe Stara Zagora players
Weymouth F.C. players
Hemel Hempstead Town F.C. players
Dartford F.C. players
Championnat National 2 players
National League (English football) players
Cameroonian expatriate footballers
Cameroonian expatriate sportspeople in England
Expatriate footballers in England
Cameroonian expatriate sportspeople in France
Expatriate footballers in France
Cameroonian expatriate sportspeople in Bulgaria
Expatriate footballers in Bulgaria